Nimmitabel is a small town in the Monaro region in southeast New South Wales, Australia, in the Snowy Monaro Regional Council  local government area.

Etymology
Nimmitabel means "the place where many waters start or divide" in the local Aboriginal language. Many various spellings were adopted for the town, including: Nimmytabell (1837), Nimmitabool (1841), Nimmittybel (1844), Nimmitabel(1845), Nimmitybelle, Nimithybale, Nymytable (all in 1848), Nimmitabil(1851), Nimitabille and Nimithy Bell(1856), Nimaty-Bell(1857), Nimmitabel(1858)

Geography
Nimmitabel is on a stretch of highway shared between the Snowy Mountains Highway (HWY B72) and the Monaro Highway (HWY B23). The area around Nimmitabel has the only true chernozem soil in Australia, a very rich, fertile and dark colored soil.

Climate
Nimmitabel has a cool maritime climate (Köppen Cfb) with mild summers and cold, frosty winters, with evenly-spread moderate rainfall throughout the year. Frosts occur regularly during autumn, winter and spring, and less commonly in summer. It is decently sunny, with 102.2 clear days annually. 

Because of its elevation and southerly latitude, several snowfalls can be expected each year from May through to October; on rare occasions, snow flurries may even occur in December (early summer).

History

 1840 Locals started calling the village Nimoitebool
 1845 Appears on Townsend's map as Nimmitabel
 1858 Church was built
 1857 Renewal of licence for hotel
 1858 Post office arrives
 1861 Bell's Store
 1863 Separate Courthouse built
 1865 Geldmacher builds windmill
 1866 Cameron's Store opens
 1869 Nimmitabel Public School opens
 1912 Railway arrives
 1921 Area's first saw-mill opens
 1959 Used as location for multi-Oscar nominated film The Sundowners
 1986 Railway closes

Gallery

References

External links

 Aerial photo of Nimmitabel from Terraserver
 Information about Nimmitabel, including history and photos
 Some history from Peter Goed, particular focus on the 1950s
 Article: "The Day the Stars Came to Nimmitabel..The Making of the Sundowners" by Peter Goed @ Cooma-Monaro website (includes photos from the making of the film in 1959)

Towns in New South Wales
Snowy Monaro Regional Council
Bombala railway line